In politics (and particularly in international politics), soft power is the ability to co-opt rather than coerce (contrast hard power). In other words, soft power involves shaping the preferences of others through appeal and attraction. A defining feature of soft power is that it is non-coercive; the currency of soft power includes culture, political values, and foreign policies. In 2012, Joseph Nye of Harvard University explained that with soft power, "the best propaganda is not propaganda", further explaining that during the Information Age, "credibility is the scarcest resource".

Nye popularised the term in his 1990 book, Bound to Lead: The Changing Nature of American Power.

In this book he wrote: "when one country gets other countries to want what it wants might be called co-optive or soft power in contrast with the hard or command power of ordering others to do what it wants". He further developed the concept in his 2004 book, Soft Power: The Means to Success in World Politics.

Description 

The Oxford English Dictionary records the phrase "soft power" (meaning "power (of a nation, state, alliance, etc.) deriving from economic and cultural influence, rather than coercion or military strength") from 1985.
Joseph Nye popularized the concept of "soft power" in the late 1980s.
For Nye, power is the ability to influence the behavior of others to get the outcomes you want. There are several ways one can achieve this: one can coerce others with threats; one can induce them with payments; or one can attract and co-opt them to want what one wants. This soft power – getting others to want the outcomes one wants – co-opts people rather than coerces them.

Soft power contrasts with "hard power" - the use of coercion and payment. Soft power can be wielded not just by states but also by all actors in international politics, such as NGOs or international institutions. It is also considered by some an example of the "second face of power"
that indirectly allows one to obtain the outcomes one wants.
A country's soft power, according to Nye, rests on three resources: "its culture (in places where it is attractive to others), its political values (when it lives up to them at home and abroad), and its foreign policies (when others see them as legitimate and having moral authority)."

Soft power resources are the assets that produce attraction, which often leads to acquiescence. Nye asserts that, "Seduction is always more effective than coercion, and many values like democracy, human rights, and individual opportunities are deeply seductive." Angelo Codevilla observed that an often overlooked essential aspect of soft power is that different parts of populations are attracted or repelled by different things, ideas, images, or prospects. Soft power is hampered when policies, culture, or values repel others instead of attracting them.

In his book, Nye argues that soft power is a more difficult instrument for governments to wield than hard power for two reasons: many of its critical resources are outside the control of governments, and soft power tends to "work indirectly by shaping the environment for policy, and sometimes takes years to produce the desired outcomes." The book identifies three broad categories of soft power: "culture", "political values", and "policies."

In The Future of Power (2011), Nye reiterates that soft power is a descriptive, rather than a normative, concept. Therefore, soft power can be wielded for nefarious purposes. "Hitler, Stalin, and Mao all possessed a great deal of soft power in the eyes of their acolytes, but that did not make it good. It is not necessarily better to twist minds than to twist arms." Nye also claims that soft power does not contradict the international relations theory of realism. "Soft power is not a form of idealism or liberalism. It is simply a form of power, one way of getting desired outcomes."

Limitations of the concept 

Soft power has been criticized as being ineffective by authors such as Niall Ferguson in the preface to Colossus. Neorealist and other rationalist and neorationalist authors (with the exception of Stephen Walt) dismiss soft power out of hand as they assert that actors in international relations respond to only two types of incentives: economic incentives and force.

As a concept, it can be difficult to distinguish soft power from hard power. For example, Janice Bially Mattern argues that George W. Bush's use of the phrase "you are either with us or with the terrorists" was in fact an exercise of hard power. Though military and economic force was not used to pressure other states to join its coalition, a kind of force – representational force – was used. This kind of force threatens the identity of its partners, forcing them to comply or risk being labeled as evil. This being the case, soft power is therefore not so soft.

There are also recent articles about the concept's neglect of its defensive use. Since Nye's approach "mainly focuses on how to get others to do your bidding", some researchers argued that rising powers, such as China, are creating new approaches to soft power, thus using it defensively.

Additionally, others have argued that more attention needs to be paid towards locating and understanding how actors' attempts at soft power can backfire, leading to reputational damage or loss, or what has been termed 'soft disempowerment'.

Measurement 
The first attempt to measure soft power through a composite index was created and published by the Institute for Government and the media company Monocle in 2010. The IfG-Monocle Soft Power Index combined a range of statistical metrics and subjective panel scores to measure the soft power resources of 26 countries. The metrics were organized according to a framework of five sub-indices including culture, diplomacy, education, business/innovation, and government. The index is said to measure the soft power resources of countries, and does not translate directly into ability influence. Monocle has published an annual Soft Power Survey since then. As of 2016/17, the list is calculated using around 50 factors that indicate the use of soft power, including the number of cultural missions (primarily language schools), Olympic medals, the quality of a country's architecture and business brands.

The Soft Power 30, which includes a foreword by Joseph Nye, is a ranking of countries' soft power produced and published by the media company Portland in 2015. The ranking is based on "the quality of a country’s political institutions, the extent of their cultural appeal, the strength of their diplomatic network, the global reputation of their higher education system, the attractiveness of their economic model, and a country’s digital engagement with the world."

The Elcano Global Presence Report scores the EU first for soft presence. Soft power, then, represents the third behavioral way of getting the outcomes you want. Soft power is contrasted with hard power, which has historically been the predominant realist measure of national power, through quantitative metrics such as population size, concrete military assets, or a nation's gross domestic product. But having such resources does not always produce the desired outcomes, as the United States discovered in the Vietnam War.

The success of soft power heavily depends on the actor's reputation within the international community, as well as the flow of information between actors. Thus, soft power is often associated with the rise of globalization and neoliberal international relations theory. Popular culture and mass media are regularly identified as a source of soft power, as is the spread of a national language or a particular set of normative structures. More particularly, international news was found crucial in shaping the image and reputation of foreign countries. The high prominence of the US in international news, for example, has been linked to its soft power. Positive news coverage was associated with positive international views, while negative news coverage with negative views.

Research 

Academics have engaged in several debates around soft power. These have included:
 Its usefulness (Giulio Gallarotti, Niall Ferguson, Josef Joffe, Robert Kagan, Ken Waltz, Mearsheimer vs Nye, Katzenstein, Janice Bially Mattern, Jacques Hymans, Alexander Vuving, Jan Mellisen)
 How soft power and hard power interact (Giulio Gallarotti, Joseph Nye)
 Whether soft power can be coercive or manipulative, (Janice BIally Mattern, Katzenstein, Duvall & Barnet vs Nye, Vuving)
 How the relationship between structure and agency work (Hymans vs Nye)
 Whether soft balancing is occurring (Wohlforth & Brooks vs Walt et al.)
 Soft power and normative power in Europe (Ian Manners, A Ciambra, Thomas Diez, A Hyde Pryce, Richard Whitman)
 How civil resistance (i.e., non-violent forms of resistance) can often involve certain uses of soft power, but remains a distinct concept (Adam Roberts, Timothy Garton Ash)

Examples

Worldwide 
The Soviet Union competed with the U.S. for influence throughout the Cold War. The Soviets were engaged in a broad campaign to convince the world of the attractiveness of its Communist system. In 1945, the Soviet Union was very effective in attracting many in Europe from its resistance to Hitler, and in colonized areas around the world because of its opposition to European imperialism. The Soviets also employed a substantially large public diplomacy program that included: promoting their high culture, broadcasting, disseminating information about the West, and sponsoring nuclear protests, peace movements, and youth organizations. Despite all of this, the Soviets' closed system and lack of popular culture impeded the ability of the Soviet Union to compete with the U.S. in terms of soft power.

A number of non-democratic governments have attempted to use migration as an instrument of soft power: Egypt under the rule of Gamal Abdel Nasser trained and dispatched thousands of teachers across the Arab world in an effort to spread ideas of anti-colonialism and anti-Zionism. In Cuba, the Fidel Castro regime's medical internationalism programme has dispatched thousands of medical professionals abroad for cultural diplomacy purposes. The Chinese-sponsored Confucius Institutes across the world rely on Chinese teachers in order to strengthen the country's soft power abroad. More recently, Turkey's migration diplomacy involves sponsoring the short-term emigration of imams across Europe and North America.

After Pope John Paul II visited Poland in 1979, some political commentators said his visit influenced events against Poland's communist government, the Soviet Union, and ultimately communism, which promoted atheism.

Besides the Pope's visit, American-government broadcasting and propaganda into Soviet-occupied Europe, particularly Poland, contributed to the rise of the Solidarity movement and to the collapse of the Soviet-backed governments there and in the rest of the Warsaw Pact alliance.

The United States and Europe have consistently been sources of influence and soft power. European culture's art, literature, music, design, fashion, and even food have been global magnets for some time. Europe and the U.S. have often claimed to support human rights and international law throughout the world. In 2012, the European Union was awarded the Nobel Peace Prize "for over six decades [it has] contributed to the advancement of peace and reconciliation, democracy and human rights in Europe." In 2019, the U.S. has the second largest diplomatic network in the world, the largest number of foreign journalists based in the country, and is the most popular destination for international students. American films, television, music, advertising, fashion, food, economic models, political culture, and literature have contributed to the Americanization of other cultures.

Asia and more recently China have been working to use the potential soft power assets that are present in the admiration of their ancient cultures, arts, fashion and cuisine. China is presenting itself as a defender of national sovereignty, which became an issue after the NATO air campaign to oust Colonel Muammar Gaddafi and NATO's support of the rebels in Libya. The Chinese are also competing with the United States to gain influence throughout the South Pacific, however some commentators have said their recent assertiveness in this region has created an appeal for nations in this region to align with the United States thus increasing U.S. soft power in this area.

Soft power extends beyond the operations of government, to the activities of the private sector and to society and culture at large. Soft power has gained more influence because it addresses the underlying dispositions of the people who have increasingly become more active in their governments. This is true even in authoritarian countries where people and institutions are increasingly able to shape the debate.

The information age has also led to the rise of soft power resources for non-state actors, Primarily, through the use of global media, and to a greater extent the internet using tools such as the World Wide Web, non-state actors have been able to increase their soft power and put pressure on governments that can ultimately affect policy outcomes. Instead of front organizations, non-state actors can create cyber advocacy organizations  to recruit members and project their voice on the global stage.

Greece
Greece had a long history of cultural barriers throughout Asia, Europe and Africa. The spread of Hellenic culture throughout Asia, Europe and Africa shows the extent of ancient Greece's influence on an intercontinental scale.

The origin of many scientific, philosophical and mathematical accomplishments, such as trigonometry, astronomy, algebra, geometry, logic, engineering, probability, biology and calculus, can be attributed to ancient Greece, and make up some of the factors behind its widespread influence. As such, these findings were diffused throughout Asia and the West by the translations provided by Islamic mathematicians.

India 

India has a long history of cultural dialogue with many regions of the world, especially within Asia, where its cultural influence has spread through the philosophy of religions like Hinduism, Jainism, Buddhism, Sikhism, etc. – particularly in East and Southeast Asia. Indian culture has spread to foreign lands through wandering traders, philosophers, migration and not through conquest.

The developments of the numbering system, the concept of zero, logic, geometry, Trigonometry, basic algebra, probability, astronomy etc., lies in Ancient India.

In the recent times the Indian cinema has played a major role in spreading Indian culture worldwide. Indian cinema transcended its boundaries from the days of film Awaara, a great hit in Russia. Bollywood films are seen in central and west Asia. Indian films have also found audience in eastern societies and are now becoming increasingly popular in Western society, with Bollywood festivals occurring in numerous cities and Bollywood dance groups performing in New Year's Eve celebrations, treatment which other non-English film industries generally do not receive.

The popularity of Ancient Indian school of Yoga throughout the globe is another example of India's soft power in the modern world. Indian commentator Harshil Mehta wrote that Ramayana, an ancient Sanskrit epic, can invoke cultural and civilisational connection of India with other Asian countries; thus, can be utilised as a soft power.

Since Independence, India has regained its more progressive schools of thought, like – democracy, secularism, rule of law, esteem for human rights, rational deductive reasoning, development of Science and Technology, etc. – are making slow but steady inroads into the collective modern Indian psyche. India's diversity forces it to evolve strong foundations of tolerance and pluralism, or face break-up. The Indian public is now also accepting modern western influences in their society and media – and what is emerging is a confluence of its past local culture with the new western culture ("Social Globalisation"). For some futuristic social thinkers, the miscegenation of diverse ancient culture with modernity, spirituality with science/technology, Eastern with Western world-view is potentially making India a social laboratory for the evolution of futuristic global-unity consciousness.

China 

China's traditional culture has been a source of attraction, building on which it has created several hundred Confucius Institutes around the world to teach its language and culture. The enrollment of foreign students in China has increased from 36,000 a decade before to at least 240,000 in 2010. China is the most popular country in Asia for international students, the leading destination globally for Anglophone African students, and the second most popular education powerhouse in the world. China's Asian Infrastructure Investment Bank has attracted many western countries to join. China has the largest diplomatic network in the world, overtaking the US in 2019. The provision of Chinese medical aid during the COVID-19 pandemic has been dubbed "facemask diplomacy".

China ranked 2nd out of 20 nations in the Elcano Global Presence Report for 2018 by the Elcano Royal Institute and 27th out of 30 nations in the Soft Power 30 index for 2018 and 2019 published by Portland Communications and the USC Center on Public Diplomacy. According to the index, China is a "cultural juggernaut", being ranked 8th in the Culture category and 10th in the Engagement category.

A spring 2014 Global Attitudes survey from Pew Research Center states China receives mostly positive reviews in the sub-Saharan African nations polled, although South Africans are closely divided (45% favorable, 40% unfavorable). China's increasing soft power can be explained by looking at China's economic growth and regarding economic engagement with many African countries. China's expansion of trade and investment on the African continent and the spread of Chinese-led infrastructure projects gives positive impressions of China to people in Africa. China's economic engagement in African countries is considered as much more pragmatic and in consistency with the priorities of many African countries. Moreover, China's increasing role as a global superpower seems appealing and this drives a desire to tie African economies more closely to China's economy.

Through the use of GONGOs (otherwise known as a Government-organized non-governmental organization), China exerts soft power through foreign aid and development in Africa. China has made a systematic effort to expand and give greater profile to its soft-power policies in Africa ever since the first Forum on China-Africa Cooperation in 2000. The commitments of China's soft power ranges from health, humanitarian assistance to academic, professional and cultural exchange.

Cultural exchange between China and Africa can be a representative example of how China has been spreading its soft power.
In 2005, the first Confucius Institute was established in Africa. The institute is funded by the Chinese government and it provides Chinese language and cultural programming to the public. There are 19 institutes today in Africa and China has planned to spend 20 million renminbi for education projects in South Africa, including the teaching of Mandarin in 50 local high schools.

Furthermore, there is an increasing support for cultural visitors programs which gained momentum in 2004 when the African Cultural Visitors Program was established. There is a rising number of African entrepreneurs who choose to move to China and there are also diaspora communities in many Chinese cities that have been found.

Outside of Africa, Chinese soft power extends to countries like Barbados. Barbadian Prime Minister David Thompson expressed admiration for the Chinese economic model and sought to emulate the way Chinese state controlled banks guided development. Chinese soft power in the Middle East countries has been expanding since the beginning of the millennium and includes many efforts in the fields of education, journalism, and popular culture. One of the most influential of China's soft power tools toward the Arab world, as Roie Yellinek et al. said in their article, are the 15 Confucius Institutes across the region.

France 
France is a country in Europe and one of the permanent members of the UN Security Council. It has long exerted a great amount of soft power. The country and its culture have for centuries been admired in many parts of the world; so much so that Thomas Jefferson is famously quoted as saying "Every man has two countries, his own and France." In 2019, France had the third largest diplomatic network in the world.

France was a focal point of the Age of Enlightenment; its attachment to the ideals of liberty, equality, tolerance and reason was notably embodied in the writing and publishing of the Encyclopédie. The French Revolution was one of the most significant events in European and world history. France has since then been instrumental in spreading Republican ideals. The Napoleonic Code, which influenced much of the rest of Europe and beyond, is regarded as one of the most important law documents of the modern era.

The French language has for centuries been an important diplomatic language. For example, French has to be used – on par with English – for all documents issued by the United Nations Treaty Series, ensuring that all UN treaties are equally valid in their English and French versions.

France has also followed for decades a very active diplomatic and cultural policy. The Alliance Française, whose aim is to promote the French language and French culture, was created as early as 1883. In Monocles 2015 "Soft Power 30" report, France was ranked first in the "engagement" criteria, which is intended to measure "the reach of states’ diplomatic network and their commitment to major challenges like development and the environment." Monocle further noted that "In terms of influential reach, France is the best networked state in the world and is member of more multi-lateral organisations than any other country." Overall, France ranked fourth in that study.

Secularism in France has inspired some countries over time. For instance, France was Atatürk's main role model for Westernization as part of the major reform efforts that he spearheaded when he was President of Turkey.

France, and in particular Paris, has long been considered one of the most romantic places to be. France was in 2014 the most visited country in the world.

 Germany 
The annual soft power rankings by Monocle magazine and the Institute for Government ranks 30 countries which "best attract favor from other nations through culture, sport, cuisine, design, diplomacy and beyond." Monocle magazine said: "Merkel may be painted as a stern taskmaster but it seems she has a softer side, or the country she leads does." It said Germany's rise as a soft power should not come as a surprise. "The country is traditionally excellent at pursuing its ideas, values and aims using diplomatic, cultural and economic tools," it said. "By quietly doing the simple things well it is a country that has become a global power and the rest of us can feel comfortable with that." Germans had been understandably wary about depicting a dominant image abroad, the magazine added, but it said that the country's rise should not make everyone else feel uncomfortable. In 2017, Germany had the eighth largest diplomatic network in the world.

 Italy 
The famous elements of Italian soft culture are its art, music, fashion, design, and iconic food. Italy was the birthplace of opera, and for generations the language of opera was Italian, irrespective of the nationality of the composer. Popular tastes in drama in Italy have long favored comedy; the improvisational style known as the Commedia dell'arte began in Italy in the mid-16th century and is still performed today. Before being exported to France and Russia, the famous Ballet dance and Opera arts also originated in Italy.
The country boasts several world-famous cities. Rome was the ancient capital of the Roman Empire and seat of the Pope of the Catholic Church. Rome is generally considered to be the "cradle of Western civilization and Christian culture". Florence was the heart of the Renaissance, a period of great achievements in the arts that ended the Dark Ages. Other important cities include Turin, which used to be the capital of Italy, and is now one of the world's great centers of automobile engineering. Milan is a fashion capital of the World. Venice, with its intricate canal system and ancient history of seafaring, attracts tourists from all over the world especially during the Venetian Carnival and the Biennale.
Italy is home to the greatest number of UNESCO World Heritage Sites (51) to date, and according to one estimate the country is home to half the world's great art treasures. The nation has, overall, an estimated 100,000 monuments of any sort (churches, cathedrals, archaeological sites, houses and statues).

Italy is considered the birthplace of Western civilization and a cultural superpower. In 2019, Italy had the ninth largest diplomatic network in the world.

 Japan 

"Cool Japan" is a concept coined in 2002 as an expression of Japan's popular culture. The concept has been adopted by the Japanese government as well as trade bodies seeking to exploit the commercial capital of the country's culture industry.Cool Japan Illustrated, http://www.cool-jp.com/index.php It has been described as a form of soft power, "the ability to indirectly influence behavior or interests through cultural or ideological means." In a 2002 article in the journal Foreign Policy titled "Japan’s Gross National Cool", Douglas McGray wrote of Japan "reinventing superpower" as its cultural influence expanded internationally despite the economic and political problems of the "lost decade." Surveying youth culture and the role of J-pop, manga, anime, video game, fashion, film, consumer electronics, architecture, and cuisine, McGray highlighted Japan's considerable soft power, posing the question of what message the country might project. He also argued that Japan's recession may even have boosted its national cool, due to the partial discrediting of erstwhile rigid social hierarchies and big-business career paths. In 2017, Japan had the fifth largest diplomatic network in the world. Anime, manga and Japanese films are considered to be soft power. Today, the culture of Japan stands as one of the most influential cultures around the world, mainly because of the global reach of its popular culture.

 Russia 
Russia has been developing its soft power by investing in various public diplomacy instruments throughout the 2000s but the term was first used in an official document in 2010 as President Medvedev approved an Addendum to the national Foreign Policy Concept. The term was not defined but it was described as related to cultural diplomacy. In 2013, the term appeared in a new version of the Foreign Policy Concept where the soft power was defined as "a comprehensive toolkit for achieving foreign policy objectives building on civil society potential, information, cultural and other methods and technologies alternative to traditional diplomacy." In 2007, Russian President Vladimir Putin was named Time Person of the Year. In 2013, he was named most powerful person by Forbes magazine. In 2015, Russia led the creation of the Eurasian Economic Union. In 2017, Russia had the fourth largest diplomatic network in the world. In the wake of the poisoning of Sergei and Yulia Skripal in 2018, the BBC reported that "Its extensive diplomatic network reflects both its imperial history as a great power in the 19th Century, as well as its Cold War posture. It has a multitude of posts in Eastern Europe and former communist allies including China, Vietnam, Cuba and Angola, as well as legacies of the former USSR in Africa and Asia. The size of its network reflects the extent of its undiminished global ambition."

 South Korea 

{{quote box |align=right|qalign=right |quote=<div style="text-align:left;">As is clear with the recent rise of Psy's "Gangnam Style", the Hallyu-wave and Korean pop music, Korean culture is making its mark on the world.—United Nations Secretary General Ban Ki-moon</div> }}

"Hallyu", also known as the "Korean Wave", is a neologism referring to the spread of South Korean culture since the late 1990s. According to a Washington Post reporter, the spread of South Korean entertainment has led to higher sales of other goods and services such as food, clothing, and Korean language classes. Besides increasing the amount of exports, the Korean Wave is used by the government as a soft power tool to engage with the masses of young people all over the world, and to try reduce anti-Korean sentiment.

In 2012, the BBC's country rating poll revealed that public opinion of South Korea has been improving every year since the first rating poll for the country was conducted in 2009. In several countries such as Russia, India, China and France, public opinion of South Korea turned from slightly negative to generally positive. The report cited culture and tradition as among the most important factors contributing to positive perceptions of South Korea. This comes alongside a rapid growth in the total value of cultural exports which rose to US$4.2 billion in 2011.

First driven by the spread of Korean dramas televised across East, South and Southeast Asia during its initial stages, the Korean Wave evolved from a regional development into a global phenomenon due to the proliferation of Korean pop (K-pop) music videos on YouTube. Developed far beyond YouTube, the most successful K-pop band, BTS, is valued to be worth US$5 billion, generating impressive revenue for South Korea. Currently, the spread of the Korean Wave to other regions of the world is most visibly seen among teenagers and young adults in Latin America, the Middle East, North Africa, and immigrant enclaves of the Western world.

 United Kingdom 
Since the 1814–1914 century of Pax Britannica the foreign relations of the United Kingdom has held a significant soft power component. It remains one of the most influential countries in the world, coming first in the 2018 and 2015 Portland Group, Comres, Facebook report, and the Monocle survey of global soft power in 2012.; 

The UK has strong diplomatic relations with countries around the world, particularly countries in the Commonwealth of Nations and many others in Europe, Asia, the Middle-east, Africa and the United States. Diplomatic missions between Commonwealth countries are known as High Commissions rather than Embassies to indicate the closeness of the relationship. The UK exerts influence on countries within the European Union, and has the eleventh largest global network of diplomatic missions as of 2019. Many countries around the world use the British form of democracy and government known as the Westminster system.

The influence of British accomplishment in science, technology and engineering had a widespread effect in the world. The concept of industrialization, physics, Gravity, optics, chemistry, biology, mathematics etc. were invented in great Britain and transmitted across the world.

The influence of British culture and sports are widespread and celebrated during the periods of the British Invasion, Cool Britannia and the Diamond and Platinum Jubilees of Elizabeth II. London was the first city to host the modern Olympics three times. At the 2012 Summer Olympics, the opening and closing ceremonies celebrated British culture and achievements with the world. The GREAT campaign of 2012 was one of the most ambitious national promotion efforts ever undertaken by any major nation. It was scheduled take maximum advantage of the worldwide attention to the Summer Olympics in London. The goals were to make British culture more visible in order to stimulate trade, investment and tourism. The government partnered with key leaders in culture, business, diplomacy and education. The campaign unified many themes and targets, including business meetings; scholarly conventions; recreational vehicle dealers; parks and campgrounds; convention and visitors bureaus; hotels; bed and breakfast inns; casinos; and hotels.Pawel Surowiec, and Philip Long, "Hybridity and Soft Power Statecraft: The ‘GREAT’ Campaign." Diplomacy & Statecraft 31:1 (2020): 1-28. online review  https://doi.org/10.1080/09592296.2020.1721092 

British media is broadcast internationally, notably the BBC World Service, BBC World News and The Economist magazine. British film and literature have international appeal, and British theatre helps make London one of the most visited cities in the world. Schools and universities in Britain are popular destinations for students of other nations and have educated many current world leaders.

Alongside the English language, English contract law is the most important and most used contract law in international business. London is the headquarters for four of the world's six largest law firms, and the Big Four accounting and professional service firms. The UK and more specifically London is a centre of international finance where foreign participants in financial markets come to deal with one another. It is headquarters for major international corporations, many of which choose to be listed on the London Stock Exchange.

Following the poisoning of Sergei and Yulia Skripal in 2018, the UK responded with bilateral and multilateral diplomatic efforts that led to nations around the world expelling one hundred and fifty Russian diplomats, described by CNN as a "remarkable diplomatic coup for Britain". British prime minister Theresa May stated in parliament that the coordinated global response was the "largest collective expulsion of Russian intelligence officers in history."

 United States 
The foreign relations of the United States has long had a great deal of soft power. Examples of the impact include Franklin D. Roosevelt's four freedoms in Europe to motivate the Allies in World War II; people behind the Iron Curtain listening to the government's foreign propaganda arm Radio Free Europe; newly liberated Afghans in 2001 asking for a copy of the Bill of Rights and young Iranians today surreptitiously watching banned American videos and satellite television broadcasts in the privacy of their homes. America's early commitment to religious toleration, for example, was a powerful element of its overall appeal to potential immigrants; and American aid in the reconstruction of Europe after World War II was a propaganda victory to show off the prosperity and the generosity of the people of the United States.

American culture has been embraced around the world for many decades. Due to America's superpower status, American culture is often seen as "hegemonic". American dominance and the popularization of American media largely contributed to the English language (particularly American English) becoming the global lingua franca. American music has had a wide influence over the development of music around the globe. American architecture and urban planning, American political and economic philosophy, and American film and television have played strong roles in shaping both western and non-western culture. American cuisine, fashion trends, literature, theatre, and dance have also widely influenced global culture of the modern era, and various subcultures that were born in the United States, such as the Hippy, Hip-hop, Punk rock, Rock 'n' roll, Greaser, Grunge, and Beatnik movements (among others) have influenced mainstream culture of the 20th and 21st centuries. American technology and social media companies hold a monopoly over the world's digital space.

Studies of American broadcasting into the Soviet bloc, and testimonials from Czech President Václav Havel, Polish President Lech Wałęsa, and Russian President Boris Yeltsin support that soft power efforts of the United States and its allies during the Cold War were ultimately successful in creating the favorable conditions that led to the collapse of the Soviet Union.

 See also 

 References 

 Bibliography 
 
 
 

 Further reading 
 Arndt, R. (2006). The First Resort of Kings: American Cultural Diplomacy in the Twentieth Century, Washington DC: Potomac Books.
 Arquilla, J., and D. Ronfeldt (1999). The Emergence of Noopolitik: Toward an American Information Strategy, Santa Monica: Rand Corporation.
 Chitty, Naren, Lilian Ji, Gary Rawnsley and Craig Hayden, eds. (2017). The Routledge Handbook of Soft Power, NY: Routledge.
 Efremenko D., Ponamareva A., Nikulichev Y. (2021). Russia's Semi-Soft Power // World Affairs. The Journal of International Issues. – New Delhi. - Vol. 25. No. 1 (Spring).
 Fraser, Matthew (2005). Weapons of Mass Distraction: Soft Power and American Empire, St. Martin's Press. Analysis is focused on the pop culture aspect of soft power, such as movies, television, pop music, Disneyland, and American fast-food brands including Coca-Cola and McDonald's.
 Gallarotti, Giulio (2010). Cosmopolitan Power in International Relations: A Synthesis of Realism, Neoliberalism, and Constructivism, NY: Cambridge University Press. How hard and soft power can be combined to optimize national power.
 Gallarotti, Giulio (2010). The Power Curse: Influence and Illusion in World Politics, Boulder, CO: Lynne Rienner Press. An analysis of how the over-reliance on hard power can diminish the influence of nations.
 Gallarotti, Giulio (2011). "Soft Power: What It Is, Why It's Important, and the Conditions Under Which It Can Be Effectively Used", Journal of Political Power, works.bepress.com.
 Kurlantzick, Joshua (2007). Charm Offensive: How China's Soft Power Is Transforming the World, Yale University Press. Analysis of China's use of soft power to gain influence in the world's political arena.
 Lukes, Steven (2007). "Power and the Battle For Hearts and Minds: On the Bluntness of Soft Power," in Berenskoetter, Felix and M.J. Williams, eds. (2007), Power in World Politics, Routledge.
 
 Mattern, Janice Bially (2006). "Why Soft Power Isn't So Soft," in Berenskoetter & Williams (see under "Lukes")
 McCormick, John (2007). The European Superpower, Palgrave Macmillan. Argues that the European Union has used soft power effectively to emerge as an alternative and as a competitor to the heavy reliance of the US on hard power.
 Nye, Joseph (2007). "Notes For a Soft Power Research Agenda," in Berenskoetter & Williams (see under "Lukes")
 Nye, Joseph (2008). The Powers to Lead, NY Oxford University Press.
 Nye, Joseph (2021) "Soft power: the evolution of a concept." Journal of Political Power Onuf, Nicholas (2017). "The Power of Metaphor/the Metaphor of Power," in The Journal of International Communication, 23,1.
 Ohnesorge, Hendrik W. (2020). Soft Power: The Forces of Attraction in International Relations, Springer International.
 Parmar, Inderjeet and Michael Cox, eds. (2010). Soft Power and US Foreign Policy: Theoretical, Historical and Contemporary Perspectives, Routledge.
 Surowiec, Pawel, and Philip Long. "Hybridity and Soft Power Statecraft: The ‘GREAT’ Campaign." Diplomacy & Statecraft 31:1 (2020): 1-28. DOI: https://doi.org/10.1080/09592296.2020.1721092.online review
 Young Nam Cho and Jong Ho Jeong, "China's Soft Power," Asia Survey'' 48, 3, pp. 453–72.

External links 

 Soft Power Committee 'Persuasion and Power' report UK Parliament
 Barack Obama & the use of soft power
 Global Power Barometer
 Is China's new communications worldview coming of age? David Bandurski
 The Benefits of Soft Power 
 Simulation and Soft Power
 Soft Power, Smart Power and Intelligent Power A lecture in honor of Joseph Nye
 Scandal Erodes China's Soft Power, Frank Ching

Diplomacy
Power (international relations)
International relations terminology
Power (social and political) concepts
Globalization
Articles containing video clips